Didier Frenay (born 9 April 1966 in Belgium) is a Belgian retired footballer.

References

Belgian footballers
Living people
1966 births
Association football midfielders
Cercle Brugge K.S.V. players
R. Charleroi S.C. players
FC Linz players
AS Cannes players
SK Vorwärts Steyr players